Kevin Vernal (born 1981) is a Filipino actor, television host, and commercial model.

Filmography

Television

Movies

References

External links

1981 births
Living people